Anders Hove may refer to:

 Anders Hove (politician) (1885–1978), Norwegian politician
 Anders Hove (actor) (born 1956), actor and director from Greenland